In the Native State is a radio play by Tom Stoppard. First broadcast by the BBC in 1991 it was later adapted by Stoppard into the stage play Indian Ink.

The production was first broadcast on BBC Radio Three on 20 April 1991. It was directed by John Tydeman and starred Felicity Kendal and Peggy Ashcroft. It was Dame Peggy's last dramatic performance and Saeed Jaffrey played the role of the Rajah.

The original production was broadcast again after the death of John Tydeman in 2020 preceded by a tribute from Tom Stoppard.

Plot
The play takes place in two timelines. In 1930 (the year of Gandhi's Salt March) Flora Crewe (Felicity Kendal), a young poet with a somewhat scandalous reputation, travels to India for her health, where she delivers a series of lectures on British literary society. She meets an Indian painter, Nirad Das, and agrees to sit for a portrait. Meanwhile in contemporary England another young Indian painter, Anish, the son of Nirad, visits Mrs Eleanor Swan (Peggy Ashcroft), the sister of Flora Crewe. Eleanor spent much of her life in India before independence, and is deeply attached to it. She and Anish clash over interpretation of Indian history and untangle the relationship of Flora and Nirad.

The title contains a pun on "native", meaning one of the states of India with its own ruler, or nudity. (The original portrait was never completed. However a second portrait by Nirad Das of Flora in the nude was discovered after their deaths. Although unauthorized, Flora had suggested the work, and enthusiastically approved the result.)

Editions
In the Native State. London: Faber, 1991 
 Tom Stoppard Radio Plays, (CD) London: British Library, 2012 
 Review at the British Universities Film & Video Council

References

Plays by Tom Stoppard
British radio dramas
Plays set in India
English-language literature